On June 3, 2011 The FMF has disaffiliated the Tiburones Rojos because of a failure of payments to the FMF.

The Federacion Mexicana de Futbol Asociacion, AC informs that the Ordinary General Assembly at its meeting today, once it analyzed the situation of Representaciones Soha , Inc., SA de CV, (Club Veracruz and / or Club Tiburones Rojos de Veracruz), a member of the Liga de Ascenso, The Mexican Football Federation, AC unanimously decided, with its power under Articles 17, 25 and other related and applicable Statute of the FMF, revoke the Certificate of Membership and consequently disaffiliate such an entity, for failing to meet its financial obligations to FMF and its affiliates.

After that announcement, it was accorded between Veracruz and Albinegros de Orizaba to unify their teams after the debts the team had.

The 2011-2012 is the club's 68th year of existence.

Apertura Squad
As of August 1st, 2011.

For recent transfers, see List of Mexican Football Transfers Summer 2011.

 (Captain)

Match results

Apertura 2011

Clausura Squad
As of January 7, 2012.

Match results

Clausura 2012

Leading Scorers

Notes 

Tiburones Rojos De Veracruz
C.D. Veracruz seasons